Dürdane Gülşah Gümüşay (born February 22, 1989 in Adana, Turkey) is a Turkish professional female basketball player. She is a small forward playing for Galatasaray Medical Park.

Awards and achievements
Turkish U18 National Team -2005, -2007
European Championships U18 -2005
Turkish TBBL Semifinals -2006, -2007
European Championships U18 in Tenerife (ESP) -2006: 7 games: 13.1ppg, 2.4rpg, 1.7apg, 1.0spg, 2FGP: 50%, 3FGP: 31.6%, FT: 57.1%
Turkish National Team -2008
Turkish TBBL All-Star Game -2008
Turkish Cup Finalist -2008
European Championships in Latvia -2009: 6 games: 3.5ppg, 1.3rpg
Turkish U20 National Team -2009
European Championships U20 in Gdynia (Poland) -2009: 8 games: 15.8ppg, 5.0rpg, 2.0apg, 1.6spg, FGP: 36.7%, 3PT: 34.5%, FT: 87.5%

See also
 Turkish women in sports

External links
Profile at Eurobasket Women 2009
Statistics at TBL.org.tr

1989 births
Living people
Sportspeople from Adana
Turkish women's basketball players
Small forwards
Botaş SK players
Galatasaray S.K. (women's basketball) players
20th-century Turkish sportswomen
21st-century Turkish sportswomen